Dietach is a municipality in the district of Steyr-Land in the Austrian state of Upper Austria.

Geography
About 17 percent of the municipality is forest, and 72 percent is farmland.

References

Cities and towns in Steyr-Land District